F.P. Taggart Store, also known as the Hobnob Corner Restaurant, is a historic general store located at Nashville, Brown County, Indiana.  It was built between 1870 and 1875, and is a two-story, balloon frame building measuring 24 feet wide by 90 feet deep.  The interior retains a number of original features including oak pane flooring.

It was listed on the National Register of Historic Places in 1983.

References

Commercial buildings on the National Register of Historic Places in Indiana
Commercial buildings completed in 1875
Buildings and structures in Brown County, Indiana
National Register of Historic Places in Brown County, Indiana
1875 establishments in Indiana